Bernard Pierre (1920–1997) was a French mountaineer, notable as a climber and an expedition leader.

Biography
Born in Chelles, Pierre was trained as a lawyer and ran his family's textile business, and was a mountaineer on the side.

He made a number of notable ascents in the Alps, including of the north face of the Aiguille du Dru and the northwest face of La Civetta. He made the second ascent of the Piz Badile's northeast face, and was a lead climber on the first ascents of a route on the Aiguille des Aigles and the face of the Aiguille de la Brenva. In 1951 he climbed in the Hoggar Mountains in southern Algeria, making a number of first ascents—he returned to the mountain range in 1961. In 1952, he led a French-American expedition including Claude Kogan to the Andes, and made the first ascent of Salcantay. Also with Claude Kogan he made the first ascent of Nun in India in 1953. He led a French-Iranian expedition to Mount Damavand for its first ascent in 1954, an expedition to the Rwenzori Mountains in 1955–1956, and to the Caucasus in 1958.

Besides a climber, Pierre was an avid writer, writing a celebrated book on synthetic textiles, and a number of books on his own mountaineering expeditions and on the "great rivers of the world".

References

1920 births
1997 deaths
French mountain climbers